Phyllonorycter alnivorella is a moth of the family Gracillariidae. It is found in France and Portugal.

The larvae feed on Alnus glutinosa. They mine the leaves of their host plant. They create a lower-surface tentiform mine, that is flat, roundish and mostly far from the midrib, but near the leaf margin. The cocoon is yellow.

External links
bladmineerders.nl
Fauna Europaea

alnivorella
Moths of Europe
Moths described in 1875